Sakuranga Fonseka (born 2 March 1993) is a Sri Lankan cricketer. He made his Twenty20 debut for Panadura Sports Club in the 2017–18 SLC Twenty20 Tournament on 25 February 2018. He made his List A debut for Panadura Sports Club in the 2017–18 Premier Limited Overs Tournament on 16 March 2018.

References

External links
 

1993 births
Living people
Sri Lankan cricketers
Panadura Sports Club cricketers
Place of birth missing (living people)